John Carruthers (25 October 1863 – 25 December 1949) was a Liberal party member of the House of Commons of Canada.

Birthplace
He was born in Hamilton, Canada West and became a physician and mayor of Little Current, Ontario.

Career
He was elected to Parliament at the Algoma East riding in the 1921 general election, defeating the Conservative incumbent George Nicholson. After serving his only term, the 14th Canadian Parliament, Carruthers was defeated by Nicholson in the 1925 federal election.

External links
 

1863 births
1949 deaths
Physicians from Ontario
Liberal Party of Canada MPs
Mayors of places in Ontario
Members of the House of Commons of Canada from Ontario